Jan Marek may refer to:

 Jan Marek (ice hockey b. 1947), ice hockey goaltender who played with the DEG Metro Stars (Germany)
 Jan Marek (ice hockey b. 1979), Czech ice hockey player who died in the 2011 Lokomotiv Yaroslavl air disaster

See also 
 Jan Marek Marci